Sue Turton (born c.1966) is a British television journalist.

Career
Sue Turton began her national television career as a reporter in the features department at Sky News. She went on to freelance for LWT and MTV before getting a correspondent's job at the new breakfast programme GMTV. She covered the north of England landing an exclusive with the whistle-blower in the Bruce Grobbelaar football scandal. She went back to freelancing in 1997 with Sky and ITV before joining Channel 4 News in 1998. She worked for the programme as both presenter and correspondent for 12 years. Sue won RTS Awards and covered different disciplines including sports news, breaking stories, investigations and foreign affairs. After leaving Channel 4 she moved to become Al Jazeera's first Afghanistan correspondent. Ten months later she was transferred to the Middle East to report on the Arab Spring. 
She covered the uprisings in Libya, Syria and Egypt. She has worked extensively for the channel in Iraq and in Lebanon.

In 2015 she was one of a number of Al Jazeera journalists convicted in Egypt of aiding and abetting a terrorist organisation. The journalists received sentences of between seven and ten years. Turton, who was tried in absentia, led the campaign to have her three imprisoned colleagues freed. They were successful in doing this but most of their convictions still stand.

Turton was forced to leave her job with Al Jazeera in June 2015 following her conviction, as it had required her to travel to countries that had extradition treaties with Egypt. She now produces and directs documentaries for channels all over the world. Her latest projects include films on the Paris attacks, Abu Sayyaf in the Philippines and school street brawls in Indonesia.

References

Living people
Al Jazeera people
British television journalists
British women television journalists
Channel 4 people
ITN newsreaders and journalists
People convicted in absentia
Place of birth missing (living people)
Year of birth missing (living people)